The order of succession to the throne of Tonga is laid down in the 1875 constitution. The crown descends according to male-preference cognatic primogeniture. Only legitimate descendants through legitimate line of King George Tupou I's son and grandson, Crown Prince Tēvita ʻUnga and Prince ʻUelingatoni Ngū, are entitled to succeed. A person loses their right of succession and deprives their descendants of their right of succession if he or she marries without the monarch's permission.

Line of succession 

The current line of succession is as follows:

 King Tupou IV (1918–2006)
 Prince Fatafehi 'Alaivahamama'o Tuku'aho (1954–2004), removed from the line of succession in 1980 after marrying a commoner
 Prince Tungi (b. 1990)
 Salote Maumautaimi Haim Hadessah Ber Yardena ‘Alanuanua Tuku’aho (b. 1991) 
 Fatafehi Sione Ikamafana Ta’anekinga ‘o Tonga Tuku'aho (b. 1994) 
 ‘Etani Ha’amea Tupoulahi Tu’uakitau Ui Tu’alangi Tuku’aho (b. 1995)
  King Tupou VI (born 1959)
 (1) The Crown Prince, Tupoutoʻa ʻUlukalala (b. 1985)
 (2) Prince Taufaʻahau Manumataongo (b. 2013)
 (3) Princess Halaevalu Mataʻaho (b. 2014)
 (4) Princess Nanasipau’u Eliana (b. 2018)
 (5) Princess Salote Mafile'o Pilolevu (b. 2021)
 (6) The Prince Ata (b. 1988)
 (7) Princess Angelika Lātūfuipeka Tukuʻaho  (b. 1983)
 (8) Princess Salote Mafile'o Pilolevu Tuita, Lady Tuita (b. 1951)
 (9) Sālote Lupepau'u Salamasina Purea Vahine Arii 'Oe Hau Tuita (b. 1977)
 (10) Phaedra Anaseini Tupouveihola Ikaleti Olo-'i-Fangatapu Fusituʻa (b. 2003)
 (11) Titilupe Fanetupouvava'u Tuita Tu'ivakano (b. 1978)
 (12) Simon Tu'iha'atu'unga George Ma'ulupekotofa Tu'ivakano  (b. 2011)
 (13) Michaela Tu'ivakano (b. 2012)
 (14) Fatafehi Tu'ivakano (b. 2013)
 (15) Frederica Lupe'uluiva Fatafehi 'o Lapaha Tuita Filipe (b. 1983)
 (16) Latu'alaifotu'aika Fahina e Paepae Tian Tian Filipe (b. 2014)
  (17) Lupeolo Halaevalu Moheofo Virginia Rose Tuita (b. 1986)

References

Tonga
Tongan monarchs
Line of succession